Mousere is a Greek Cypriot village in the Paphos District of Cyprus, located  northeast of Archimandrita. In 1960 the village had a population of 69 people. In the municipal elections of 2011, Mousere had 6 pensioner voters registered although they have not been included in the 1992 and 2001 census reports due to their arguable unwillingness to register for the census. They elected Ioanna Meletiou as Community President. Mousere has 2 churches and 10 standing houses. The main church is dedicated to Timios Prodromos and the second to Ayia Sophia. Mousere has no urban planning zone. Mousere has experienced a cataclysmic decline in its livestock population. Whereas in 1994 there had been 261 sheep, 445 goats and 40 chickens in 2009, this had been eradicated to 0.

References

Communities in Paphos District